Ernani Pereira (born 22 January 1978 in Belo Horizonte, Brazil) is a retired footballer who played as a defender. Born in Brazil, Pereira represented the Azerbaijan national football team.

International
He made his national team debut against Portugal on 7 October 2006 where Azerbaijan lost 3-0.

Career statistics

References

External links

Brazilian FA database 
Profile at TFF

1978 births
Living people
Footballers from Belo Horizonte
Azerbaijani footballers
Azerbaijan international footballers
Brazilian footballers
Brazilian emigrants to Azerbaijan
Naturalized citizens of Azerbaijan
Association football defenders
Azerbaijani expatriate footballers
Brazilian expatriate footballers
Expatriate footballers in Turkey
Azerbaijani expatriate sportspeople in Turkey
Süper Lig players
TFF First League players
Azerbaijan Premier League players
Konyaspor footballers
Vila Nova Futebol Clube players
Cruzeiro Esporte Clube players
Guarani FC players